Golica is a settlement in the Municipality of Železniki in the Upper Carniola region of Slovenia.

Name
Golica was attested in historical sources as Golitsch in 1291, Gollitz in 1457, and Dolenigolitzi and Gorenigolitzi (referring to the hamlets of Spodnja Golica and Zgornja Golica) in 1500, among other spellings.

Church

The local church on Mount Saint Nicholas above the settlement is dedicated to Saint Nicholas. It is an easy climb and is a popular destination with day-trippers and hikers.

References

External links 

Golica at Geopedia
Železniki museum on the Slovenian Tourist Association web site

Populated places in the Municipality of Železniki
Cities and towns in Upper Carniola